Distance was a late-1980s rock/funk band led by bassist/producer Bernard Edwards, patterned after the Power Station.  The band was composed of former Chic and Power Station members Edwards (bass) and Tony Thompson (drums) with future Bad Company member Robert Hart on lead vocals, and noted session musicians Eddie Martinez on guitar and Jeff Bova on keyboards.

This "supergroup" released only one album, 1989's Under the One Sky on Reprise Records.  The album failed to make the chart and produced no hits. Richard Drummie, one half of Go West, has a co-writing credit on the track "Everytime I Stand Up."

Distance appeared as the club band in the 1987 Whoopi Goldberg movie, Burglar.  Bernard Edwards was the film's Music Producer, and was credited for the songs that appeared within.

Discography

Studio albums
 Under the One Sky (1989)

Soundtrack appearances
 "Bernie's Groove", "New Way of Living", "News at 11" (from Burglar) (1987)

Film appearances
 Appeared as the club band in the Whoopi Goldberg movie, Burglar (1987)

References

Rock music supergroups
American rock music groups
Musical groups established in 1987